The 2019–20 Football Championship of Volyn Oblast was won by Shakhtar Novovolynsk.

The season that started on 31 August 2019 was extended and ended on 11 November 2020.

League table

References

External links

Football
Volyn